Sticteulima badia is a species of sea snail, a marine gastropod mollusk in the family Eulimidae.

References

 Gofas, S.; Le Renard, J.; Bouchet, P. (2001). Mollusca. in: Costello, M.J. et al. (eds), European Register of Marine Species: a check-list of the marine species in Europe and a bibliography of guides to their identification. Patrimoines Naturels. 50: 180-213

External links
 Watson, R. B. (1897). On the marine Mollusca of Madeira; with descriptions of thirty-five new species, and an index-list of all the known sea-dwelling species of that island. Journal of the Linnean Society of London, Zoology. 26(19): 233-329, pl. 19-20

badia
Gastropods described in 1897